2004 World Cup can refer to:
The 2004 World Cup of Hockey
The 2004 Alpine Skiing World Cup
The 2004 Speedway World Cup
The 2004 ISSF World Cup

See also
 2004 Continental Championships (disambiguation)
 2004 World Championships (disambiguation)
 2004 World Junior Championships (disambiguation)